Tom Lee may refer to:

Sports
Tom Lee (baseball) (1862–1886), baseball player in 1884
Tom Lee (footballer, born 1874) (1874–?), Australian rules footballer for Collingwood
Tom Lee (footballer, born 1991), Australian rules footballer for St Kilda

Other
Tom Lee (Florida politician) (born 1962), Republican politician, former president of the Florida Senate
Tom Lee (New Mexico politician) (1920–1986), first Navajo member of the New Mexico Senate
Tom J. Lee (1923–1996), member of the Texas House of Representatives
Tom Lee Music, a music superstore in Hong Kong and Canada
Tom Lee Park, in Memphis, Tennessee
Tom Stewart Lee (born 1941), U.S. federal judge 
Tom Lee, the main character of the play Tea and Sympathy and the film adaptation

See also 
Thomas Lee (disambiguation)
Tommy Lee (disambiguation)
Tom Lea (disambiguation)
Tom Leigh (disambiguation)